Johann Nopel der Ältere (died 6 Jul 1556) was a Roman Catholic prelate who served as Auxiliary Bishop of Cologne (1539–1556).

Biography
On 29 Oct 1539, Johann Nopel der Ältere was appointed during the papacy of Pope Paul III as Auxiliary Bishop of Cologne and Titular Bishop of Cyrene. He served as Auxiliary Bishop of Cologne until his death on 6 Jul 1556. While bishop, he was the principal consecrator of Rembert von Kerssenbrock, Bishop of Paderborn (1548).

See also 
Catholic Church in Germany

References

External links and additional sources
 (for Chronology of Bishops) 
 (for Chronology of Bishops)  
 (for Chronology of Bishops) 
 (for Chronology of Bishops)  

16th-century German Roman Catholic bishops
Bishops appointed by Pope Paul III
1556 deaths